Missile FC is a football (soccer) club from Gabon based in the capital Libreville.

Achievements
Gabon Championnat National D1: 1
2010–11

Performance in CAF competitions
CAF Champions League: 1 appearance
2012 – Preliminary Round

CAF Confederation Cup: 1 appearance
2011 – First Round of 16

Football clubs in Gabon
Football clubs in Libreville
2003 establishments in Gabon
Military association football clubs